Intelsat II F-3, also known as Canary Bird was a communications satellite operated by Intelsat. Launched in 1967 it was operated in geostationary orbit, spending most of its operational life at a longitude of 15 degrees west.

The third of four Intelsat II satellites to be launched, Intelsat II F-3 was built by Hughes Aircraft around the HS-303A satellite bus. It carried two transponders, which were powered by body-mounted solar cells generating 85 watts of power.

Intelsat II F-3 was launched atop a Delta E1 rocket flying from Launch Complex 17B at the Cape Canaveral Air Force Station. The launch took place at 01:30:12 on March 23, 1967, with the spacecraft entering a geosynchronous transfer orbit. It fired an SVM-1 apogee motor to place itself into its operational geostationary orbit. The spacecraft was operated at a longitude of 15° west, over the Atlantic Ocean. It was briefly relocated to 35° west in 1972, but had returned to 15° west by the following year.

It acquired the unofficial nickname Canary Bird because of the association of the mission with Maspalomas Station, the ground station which is located in the Canary Islands.

References

Intelsat satellites
Hughes aircraft
Spacecraft launched in 1967
Transatlantic telecommunications